Lansdowne, also known as Upper Deale or Lansdowne Farm, is a historic home and farm complex located at Centreville, Queen Anne's County, Maryland, United States. It consists of a brick dwelling, and a large barn, granary, and several outbuildings. The house was built in two distinct periods. The earliest house dates to the late colonial period and is a two-story, brick house, three bays wide and two rooms deep, with a single flush chimney on each gable. It is attached to a larger, Federal-period house built in 1823. The later house is brick, two and a half stories high, and was built directly adjoining the west gable of the earlier structure.

Lansdowne was listed on the National Register of Historic Places in 1984.

References

External links
, including photo from 1978, at Maryland Historical Trust

Houses on the National Register of Historic Places in Maryland
Houses in Queen Anne's County, Maryland
Federal architecture in Maryland
Houses completed in 1760
National Register of Historic Places in Queen Anne's County, Maryland